The Tribal class, or Afridi class, were a class of destroyers built for the Royal Navy, Royal Canadian Navy and Royal Australian Navy that saw service in World War II. Originally conceived during design studies for a light fleet cruiser, the Tribals evolved into fast, powerful destroyers, with greater emphasis on guns over torpedoes than previous destroyers, in response to new designs by Japan, Italy, and Germany. The Tribals were well admired by their crews and the public when they were in service due to their power, often becoming symbols of prestige while in service.

As some of the Royal Navy's most modern and powerful escort ships, the Tribal class served with distinction in nearly all theatres of World War II. Only a handful of Royal Navy Tribals survived the war, all of which were subsequently scrapped from hard use, while Commonwealth Tribals continued to serve into the Cold War, serving with distinction in the Korean War. Only one Tribal survives to this day: , which is now a museum ship in Hamilton Harbour, Ontario, Canada.

Design history
During the interwar period, advances in armament and machinery meant that by the mid-1930s, these "interwar standard" destroyers were being eclipsed by foreign designs, particularly from Japan, Italy, and Germany. To counteract this trend, the Admiralty decided on a new destroyer type, with an emphasis on gunnery over torpedo warfare. The destroyer was based on 'Design V', a design study for a small fleet cruiser (another variant of this design evolved into the ).

Although the design was rejected for the fleet cruiser role, by August 1935, after no less than eight design proposals, it had evolved to present a destroyer with eight 4.7 inch Quick Firing Mark XII guns, in four twin mountings, with a maximum elevation of 40°, controlled by a low-angle (LA) director and high-angle / low-angle (HA/LA) rangefinder director on the bridge. To provide close range anti-aircraft protection, the design was fitted with a quadruple Mark VII QF 2 pdr "pom pom" mounting, and two quadruple Vickers .50-inch machine guns. These ships introduced the Fuze Keeping Clock High Angle Fire Control Computer, which was used on all subsequent British wartime destroyers. The ships were also armed with a quadruple bank of torpedo tubes. They were considered to be handsome ships, with a clipper bow that provided excellent seakeeping and two raked funnels and masts. They are remembered with great affection to this day.

Construction
The Royal Navy placed an order for seven Tribals on 10 March 1936, with a second group of nine Tribals ordered on 9 June for two flotillas' worth of ships. The Royal Australian Navy and Royal Canadian Navy both ordered a flotilla of Tribals. The eight Australian ships were to be built in Australian shipyards. Three were completed, two in 1942 and one in 1945, but the rest were cancelled. The Canadian order was for four ships from British yards in 1940 (completed in 1942 and 1943) and another four from Canadian yards at Halifax in 1942. The latter were not completed until after the war.

Between 1937 and 1945, twenty-seven Tribals were built. Estimated cost per ship was around £340,000 excluding weaponry, and £520,000 overall.

Modifications

Wartime modifications
The Royal Navy equipped the Tribal class with a comparatively heavy anti-aircraft armament; all eight 4.7in guns could engage aircraft with predicted fire using the FKC computer, and thus provide a powerful augmentation to the battle-fleet's AA defence. The close range AA armament of a quad 2pdr and two quad Vickers machine guns was a marked advance over previous destroyer classes and heavier than most other nations' close range destroyer armament in 1939. However, prewar, the Royal Navy assumed that destroyers would be acting mainly as escorts for the battle-fleet, and would not be the primary focus of aerial attack and would not require more than 40-degree elevation for the main armament. Events soon showed that destroyers often functioned independently and so became the main target of Luftwaffe attack, especially by dive bombers. After the loss of Afridi and Gurkha, the remaining ships were taken in hand to improve the situation. Each ship's 'X' turret, which held a 4.7-inch mounting, was removed and replaced by two QF  Mark XVI guns on the twin HA/LA Mark XIX mounting. The mainmast was cut down and the rear funnel was lowered to improve the arcs of fire for the anti-aircraft weapons. As they became available, the more effective 20 mm Oerlikon guns were added, at first adding to and eventually replacing the .50 in./12.7 mm machine guns. Depth charge storage was also increased, from 30 to 46 charges. Furthermore, the class initially had problems with leaks in feedwater tanks; this was traced to issues with the turbine blades caused by structural stress when steaming at high speed in rough weather.

By 1944, the four surviving British Tribals were given a tall lattice foremast to carry a Type 293 radar target indication and Type 291 air warning, with Type 285 radar added to the rangefinder-director. The first two Canadian built Tribals, Micmac and Nootka, were armed with the then standard armament of three 4.7-inch twin mountings and a single twin 4-inch mount, with the 4.7-inch mounts being given improved A.A. fuze setters, while the last two Canadian-built Tribals were equipped with eight Mark XVI guns with R.P.C. and four to six Bofors 40 mm guns as standard, along with a Mk VI Director.

Post-war modifications
Post war, survivors of the class met different fates:  Royal Navy Tribals were retired by the 1950s, while Tribals in service with the Australian and Canadian navies continued in service, with many refitted as anti-submarine destroyers. The British-built Canadian Tribals landed their 4.7-inch guns, and received a pair of 4-inch Mark XVI guns in twin mounts in the 'A' and 'B' positions instead, improving anti-aircraft capabilities, a pair of Squid mortars for anti-submarine warfare, and a twin 3 inch/50 Mark 33 gun on the 'X' position as an anti-aircraft weapon. Sensors were also upgraded for their new roles, and as refitted, Canadian Tribals continued to serve until the 1960s.

Two of the Australian Tribals, Arunta and Warramunga, were modernised during the early 1950s. The aft-most  gun mounting was removed, with the space modified to accommodate a Squid anti-submarine mortar. New sonar and radar units were fitted, the latter requiring the replacement of the tripod radar mast with a stronger lattice structure. Although the modernisation was intended to take less than six months per ship, it took two years for each ship to be refitted, by which time their modifications had already become obsolete. Financial restrictions meant that the third Australian Tribal, Bataan, was not modernised, and a combination of manpower shortages and rapid obsolescence saw all three ships decommissioned by the end of the 1950s.

Ships

Royal Navy

Royal Canadian Navy

Royal Australian Navy

Service
As some of the Royal Navy's most modern and powerful escorts, they were widely deployed in World War II, and served with great distinction in nearly all theatres of war. The Tribals were often selected for special tasks and as a result, losses were heavy, with 12 of the 16 Royal Navy Tribals sunk, as well as one Canadian ship. Gurkha has the rare and unfortunate distinction of being the name of two ships that were sunk in World War II: the L-class destroyer  was renamed to honour the lost Tribal-class ship, and was herself lost in 1942.

1940

Cossack earned fame early on in the war, when on 6 February 1940, commanded by Captain Philip Vian, she pursued and then boarded the German tanker  in neutral Norwegian waters in a daring attack to rescue around 300 British prisoners of war on board. Referred to as the Altmark Incident, this was the last true naval boarding action for the Royal Navy. Gurkha was an early loss, being sunk by German bombers off Stavanger. Afridi was lost soon afterwards to dive bombers while evacuating troops from Namsos. Bedouin, Punjabi, Eskimo and Cossack took part in the Second Battle of Narvik, where Eskimo had her bow blown off.

1941
Maori and Sikh were amongst the victors at the Battle of Cape Bon in December. Bedouin took part in Operation Archery, a British combined operations raid which diverted German resources to Norway for the rest of the war.

1942
Punjabi was accidentally rammed and sunk by the battleship  in May, whilst performing close escort in thick weather. In June, Bedouin was disabled in action with Regia Marina's cruisers  and  during Operation Harpoon. Although later taken in tow by  the tow had to be cast when the Italian cruisers reappeared and, dead in the water, Bedouin was sunk by aircraft torpedo attack. Ashanti was assigned to Operation Pedestal of August 1942. In September, the final two Tribals lost in the Battle of the Mediterranean were sunk; Sikh and Zulu during a disastrous raid on Tobruk. Also that month, Somali was torpedoed by  while covering the returning Russian Convoy QP 14. This was the last Royal Navy Tribal lost during the war.

1943
In 1943, the four remaining British Tribals (Ashanti, Eskimo, Tartar, and Nubian) participated in Operation Retribution to prevent the Afrika Korps from being evacuated to Italy. Tartar, Nubian and Eskimo then covered the Allied invasion of Sicily. After the invasion of Sicily, the four then covered the Allied invasion of Italy at Salerno. Ashanti and Athabaskan then covered Arctic convoy RA 55A, which was involved in the Battle of North Cape, where the German battleship  was sunk.

At the same time, the two active Australian Tribals, Arunta and Warramunga, were attached to the joint Australian-American Task Force 74 and supported a series of landings in New Britain, and deployed to support a series of landings in Operation Cartwheel.

The Canadian Tribals were also heavily engaged; Athabaskan was hit by German glide bombs while conducting operations in the Bay of Biscay and was put out of action for almost three months, while Haida and Huron escorted the various Arctic convoys.

1944
Eskimo, Ashanti, Athabaskan, Haida, Huron, Nubian, Tartar and later Iroquois saw extensive action in the English Channel before and after Operation Overlord, sinking or damaging a variety of enemy ships.

In April,  and  engaged two s in the Channel. Athabaskan was sunk by a torpedo from T24, while Haida pursued and forced aground T27. Afterward, Haida returned and managed to rescue 42 personnel from Athabaskan. One of the under-construction Canadian Tribals was then renamed Athabaskan as a tribute to the lost ship. Furthermore, Haida and Eskimo also sank the German U-boat  with depth charges and close in gunfire, rescuing 53 survivors. Afterward, Eskimo was involved in a collision with the destroyer HMS Javelin, which kept Eskimo out of action for five months.

Iroquois and Haida met up with the Free French cruiser  which was sailing from Algiers to Cherbourg carrying members of the French Provisional Government. Iroquois then escorted the liner  which was carrying the British Prime Minister Winston Churchill to the Second Quebec Conference.

1945
Eskimo, Nubian, and Tartar were given some minor tropicalisation refits and were sent east to join the British Eastern Fleet in the Indian Ocean as the Atlantic war wound down. There, Eskimo, Nubian, and Tartar engaged in escort of the Royal Navy major surface units and shore bombardment. Afterward, Nubian, and Tartar were waiting as backup for Battle of the Malacca Strait, where the Japanese cruiser  was sunk. Eskimo and Nubian were then engaged in anti-shipping patrols, sinking a Japanese merchant ship and a submarine chaser near Sumatra. This was the last Royal Navy surface action against shipping in World War II. In July, Nubian and Tatar prepared for Operation Zipper, the planned British landings in Malaya.

During this period, the Canadian Tribals continued to be engaged; Haida, Huron and Iroquois escorted Russian convoys until May 1945, when Germany surrendered. The Canadian Tribals then engaged in the escort of British warships liberating Norway following the German surrender. Following this, the Canadian Tribals then returned to Halifax harbour for tropicalisation refits, which were suspended when the Japanese surrendered, and were sent into reserve.

Post-war
Twenty-three Tribal-class destroyers were constructed before and during World War II; sixteen for the Royal Navy, four for the Royal Canadian Navy, and three for the Royal Australian Navy. Thirteen were lost during the war; six British Tribals to aircraft attack, four British and one Canadian Tribal to torpedo attacks, one British Tribal to shore batteries off Tobruk, and one British Tribal in a collision with a British battleship.

The surviving four British destroyers were paid off and sold for scrap during 1948 and 1949, while the Australian and Canadian Tribals were refitted and modernised for post-war service. Four destroyers still under construction in Canada when World War II ended were completed and then modernised, while five ships under construction in Australia were cancelled.

The Australian and Canadian ships, with the exception of Micmac, served during the Korean War, with Bataan at one point escorting a United States aircraft carrier with the same name. The Australian and Canadian Tribals continued in service until the late 1950s and early 1960s, when they were gradually decommissioned and sold for scrapping.

Only one ship of the class has been preserved.  was restored and is docked in Hamilton Harbour, Ontario, Canada as a museum ship.

Notes

References
 
 Unlucky Lady: The Life and Death of HMCS Athabaskan 1940–44, Len Burrow & Emile Beudoin, Canada's Wings, 1983, 

 
 
 
 HMCS Haida: Battle Ensign Flying, Barry M. Gough, Vanwell, 2001,

External links

 HMCS Haida Official Web Site
 Canadian Tribal Destroyer Association
 Booklet of general plans, circa 1941. Courtesy of the Historic Naval Ships Association.

Destroyer classes
 
Ship classes of the Royal Navy